The 2008–09 Liga Leumit season began on 29 August 2008 and ended on 29 May 2009.

Two teams from Liga Artzit were promoted at the end of the previous season: Hapoel Jerusalem and Maccabi Ironi Kiryat Ata along with two teams relegated from Israeli Premier League: Maccabi Herzliya and Hapoel Kfar Saba.The two teams relegated to Liga Artzit were Hapoel Nazareth Illit and Hapoel Rishon LeZion.

Due to an expected league expansion, at the end of the season five clubs were automatically promoted to the Israeli Premier League, whilst the sixth-placed club in Liga Leumit played in a play-off match against the 11th-placed team in the Premier League. Only one team relegated automatically, and one team played in a play-off match against a team from Liga Artzit (which ceased to exist, with the regionalised Liga Alef becoming the third tier).

Stadia

1Currently undergoing construction work to convert it to a 5,000-seat stadium. In the meanwhile they play at the Nahariya Municipal Stadium.

League table

Positions by round

Results
The schedule consisted of three rounds. During first two rounds, each team played each other once home and away for a total of 22 matches. The pairings of the third round were then set according to the standings after first two rounds, giving every team a third game against each opponent for a total of 33 games per team.

First and second round

Third round
Key numbers for pairing determination (number marks position after 22 games):

Promotion/relegation playoff

Promotion playoff
Maccabi Ahi Nazareth as the 6th-placed team faced the 11th-placed Israeli Premier League team Hakoah Ramat Gan for a two-legged playoff. Maccabi Ahi Nazareth won both games and were promoted to the Israeli Premier League.

Relegation playoff
Ironi Ramat HaSharon as the 11th-placed team faced the 8th-placed Liga Artzit team Maccabi Kafr Kanna for a two-legged playoff, Ironi Ramat HaSharon won both games and will continue playing in Liga Leumit next season.

Season statistics

Scoring
First goal of the season: Eran Levy for Hapoel Haifa against Hapoel Acre, 26th minute (29 August 2008)
Widest winning margin: 6 goals – Hapoel Acre 7–1 Hapoel Haifa (22 May 2009)
Most goals in a match: 8 goals – Hapoel Acre 7–1 Hapoel Haifa (22 May 2009)

Discipline
First yellow card of the season: Muhamad Brik for Hapoel Acre against Hapoel Haifa, 3rd minute (29 August 2008)
First red card of the season: Bryan Gerzicich for Hapoel Acre against Hapoel Haifa, 36th minute (29 August 2008)
Most red cards in a single match: 3 – Hapoel Acre 2–1 Maccabi Ahi Nazareth - 3 for Maccabi Ahi Nazareth (Amjad Suliman, Yakir Shina & Serge Ayeli) (6 December 2008)

Top scorers

See also
2008–09 Toto Cup Leumit

References

Liga Leumit seasons
Israel
2008–09 in Israeli football leagues